Brigadier general (professor) Dan Kuwali serves in the Malawian Defence Force as the Chief of Legal Services and Judge Advocate General. Dan Kuwali is an author, a Professor of International Law and International Relations at the University of Pretoria and an Affiliated Professor at the Raoul Wallenberg Institute of Human Rights and Humanitarian Law, Lund University.

Early life and education 
Brigadier General (Professor) Dan Kuwali, went to Dedza Secondary School. He holds a Master of Strategic Studies, War, Peace, Policy and Strategy from The United States Army War College and an LLD. (Doctor of Laws), in Public and International Law from Lund University.

Publications 
Dan Kuwali is an author and has published books titled, Persuasive Prevention: Towards a Mechanism for Implementing Article 4(h) and R2p by the African Union.  The Responsibility to Protect (Raoul Wallenberg Institute Human Rights Library) , By All Means Necessary: Protecting Civilians and Preventing Mass Atrocities in Africa, and The Palgrave Handbook of Sustainable Peace and Security in Africa, and in 2014 he edited an article with Frans Viljoen titled, Africa and the Responsibility to Protect: Article 4(h) of the African Union Constitutive Act.

References 

Living people
Lund University alumni
Malawian Defence Force officers
Year of birth missing (living people)